Marcus James Kennedy (born January 29, 1967) is an American former professional basketball player. He was a second round NBA draft pick and played professionally in several countries.

Kennedy, a 6'7" power forward, played college basketball at NCAA Division II Ferris State University from 1986 to 1989, then transferred to NCAA Division I Eastern Michigan for his senior season.  Kennedy averaged 20.0 points and 8.1 rebounds and was named Mid-American Conference Player of the Year and led the Eagles to the program's first NCAA tournament Sweet 16.

After his college career, Kennedy was drafted in the second round of the 1991 NBA Draft by the Portland Trail Blazers (54th pick overall), but did not make the team.  Instead, Kennedy played for the Grand Rapids Hoops of the Continental Basketball Association (CBA), where he averaged 22.6 points and 10.5 rebounds per game and was named first team all-league and CBA Rookie of the Year.  He would play parts of four seasons for the Hoops (later called the Grand Rapids Mackers), averaging 16.5 points and 8.0 rebounds for his CBA career.  Kennedy also played professionally in Spain, Italy, Argentina and Japan.

References

External links
Spanish League profile
College statistics from the Draft Review

1967 births
Living people
American expatriate basketball people in Argentina
American expatriate basketball people in Italy
American expatriate basketball people in Japan
American expatriate basketball people in Spain
American men's basketball players
Basketball players from Michigan
CB Murcia players
Eastern Michigan Eagles men's basketball players
Ferris State Bulldogs men's basketball players
Grand Rapids Hoops players
Grand Rapids Mackers players
Juvecaserta Basket players
Liga ACB players
People from Highland Park, Michigan
Portland Trail Blazers draft picks
Power forwards (basketball)